Joseph Thomas DuMoe (July 30, 1895 – February 23, 1959) was an American football player and coach. He served as the head football coach at Fordham University from 1920 to 1921, compiling a record of 8–6–2. In 1920, he was co-head coach with Charles Brickley. Dumoe played college football at Syracuse University, Fordham, and Lafayette College. He played professionally in the American Professional Football Association (APFA)—now known as National Football League (NFL)–with the Rochester Jeffersons in 1920 and 1921.

DuMoe later worked in Los Angeles as superintendent of brokerage sales for Occidental Life Insurance Company of California. He died on February 23, 1959, at a hospital in Pasadena, California following a long illness.

Head coaching record

References

External links
 

1895 births
1959 deaths
American businesspeople in insurance
American football ends
Fordham Rams football coaches
Lafayette Leopards football players
Rochester Jeffersons players
Syracuse Orange football players
People from Pine County, Minnesota
Coaches of American football from Minnesota
Players of American football from Duluth, Minnesota